This page includes the videography of American singer Mary J. Blige.

Music videos

1990s

2000s

2010s

Music Videos (featuring Mary J. Blige)

References

Videography
Blige, Mary J.